San Mateo is a census-designated place in Cibola County, New Mexico, United States. The population was 161 at the 2010 census.

The community has a Catholic church, a Baptist church, a Morada, a cemetery, a Volunteer Fire Department(McKinley County funded) and an old abandoned elementary school.  It is also coined "the Uranium Capital of the World".

Geography
San Mateo is located at  (35.331423, -107.643110). It overlooks Mount Taylor. San Mateo lies 7313 feet (2229 m) above sea level.

Demographics

References

Census-designated places in Cibola County, New Mexico
Census-designated places in New Mexico